"Getcha Back" is a song written by Mike Love and Terry Melcher for the American rock band The Beach Boys, on their 1985 album The Beach Boys. It was the band's first release since the drowning death of Dennis Wilson in 1983. The song peaked at number 26 nationally and number two on the Adult Contemporary chart.

Musically, the backing vocals resemble those from the 1959 hit "Hushabye" by The Mystics, which the Beach Boys had covered in 1964 for their All Summer Long album. Comparisons could also be made to Bruce Springsteen's 1980 hit "Hungry Heart", which Love later recorded a cover of for a tribute album. The AllMusic review by William Ruhlmann stated that "despite the production sheen provided by Steve Levine (of Culture Club fame), this is another competent but uninspired effort."

Reception
Cash Box said the song "so wonderously recalls [The Beach Boys'] earlier times and earlier sounds."

Music video
The music video, directed by Dominic Orlando, was filmed on location in Malibu and Venice, California. It featured a then-unknown Katherine Kelly Lang, who went on to play Brooke Logan on the soap opera The Bold and the Beautiful.

Chart positions

Cover versions

Mark McGrath, lead singer of the California rock band Sugar Ray, performed a cover of this song for the soundtrack of Herbie: Fully Loaded (2005). The Beach Boys version appears at the beginning, during the flashback of Herbie's racing career, during the opening credits.

Mike Love re-recorded the song for his 2017 solo album Unleash the Love. This version features altered lyrics and a new third verse, and features John Stamos on percussion.

References

1985 songs
1985 singles
The Beach Boys songs
Songs written by Mike Love
Songs written by Terry Melcher
Song recordings produced by Steve Levine